FK Rađevac is a Serbian football club from Krupanj.

History
The club was established in 1922 as Rađevac; however, it folded in 1925. In 1948, after World War II, Rađevac was reestablished. Shortly after, the club became part of the Football League in Western Serbia.

In 1950, the club entered  the Belgrade Football League.

In 1970, the club entered the Podrinje-Kolubara League. In 1972, the club took second place. In 1975, the club entered the Posavina-Podunavlje Zone League.

In 1978–79, the club was placed first in the Posavina-Podunavlje Zone League during the fall and won the Podrinje Cup.

In 1980–81, the club finished in second place in the Posavina-Podunavlje Zone League (out of 14 teams), right behind FK Jedinstvo Ub.

In 1982, the club entered the Second Serbian League.

In 1992, the club entered the newly formed Podunavlje-Posavina Zone League.

In 1999, the club made its biggest success by entering the Second League of FR Yugoslavia.

In 2021, the club repeated one of the greatest successes in its history by winning first place in the Kolubara-Mačva Zone League, and placement in the Serbian League West after 23 years.

Notable players
Dragan Pantelić
Zvonko Popović
Njegoš Petrović

Radjevac
1922 establishments in Serbia